The 2012–13 Mercer Bears men's basketball team represented Mercer University during the 2012–13 NCAA Division I men's basketball season. The Bears, led by fifth year head coach Bob Hoffman, played their home games at Hawkins Arena on the university's Macon, Georgia campus and were members of the Atlantic Sun Conference. They finished the season 24–12, 14–4 in A-Sun play to win the regular season conference championship. They advanced to the championship game of the Atlantic Sun tournament where they lost to Florida Gulf Coast. As a regular season conference champions who failed to win their conference tournament, they received an automatic bid to the 2013 NIT where they defeated Tennessee in the first round before losing in the second round to BYU.

Roster

Schedule
 
|-
!colspan=9| Regular season

|-
!colspan=9| 2013 Atlantic Sun tournament

|-
!colspan=9| 2013 NIT

References

Mercer Bears men's basketball seasons
Mercer
Mercer
Mercer Bears
Mercer Bears